Roszkówko may refer to the following places:
Roszkówko, Jarocin County in Greater Poland Voivodeship (west-central Poland)
Roszkówko, Rawicz County in Greater Poland Voivodeship (west-central Poland)
Roszkówko, Wągrowiec County in Greater Poland Voivodeship (west-central Poland)